"Come Back My Love" is a song by American doo-wop group The Wrens, released in 1955 by Rama Records. The song is best known for the version by the British doo-wop revival band Darts in 1978, which peaked at number 2 on the UK Singles Chart.

The song was originally released in January 1955, titled "(Will You) Come Back My Love". However, the title was soon shortened and released as "Come Back My Love". In February, the single was then re-released with a different flip side, "Eleven Roses". The song achieved some local popularity in New York and is seen as the group's signature song.

Darts version 

Darts released their cover of the song in January 1978 as the second and final single from their 1977 debut album Darts.

Charts

Weekly charts

Year-end charts

Other recordings and samples 

 In June 1955, R&B group The Cardinals released a cover of the song as their eighth single.
 In 1989, Jive Bunny and the Mastermixers sampled the song in "Hopping Mad" from their album Jive Bunny: The Album.
 In 1992, Dutch singer Gerard Joling covered the song as a non-album single, which reached number 48 on the Dutch Single Top 100.
 In 1999, British band The Firebirds covered the song on their album Let's Go.
 An instrumental version of the song was the last recorded song to have played in the Austin J. Tobin Plaza of the World Trade Center during the attacks of September 11, 2001, just before the collapse of the South Tower.

 In 2010, British-Irish doo-wop boy band The Overtones covered the song on their debut album Good Ol' Fashioned Love.

References 

1955 singles
1955 songs
1978 singles